Vassar Clements, John Hartford, Dave Holland is an album by musicians John Hartford, Vassar Clements, Dave Holland and Mark Howard, released in 1985.

Track listing
 "Pea Patch Jig" (Traditional) – 5:05
 "You Can't Run Away from Your Feet" – 3:30
 "Memories of Home" – 3:15
 "Home Cooking" – 4:00
 "Ten Past Eleven" – 4:00
 "Scapin' Out on the Roof" (John Hartford) – 3:26
 "Till Something Better Comes Along" – 5:50
 "You and the Way You Do" – 2:54
 "Evening Prayer" – 3:55
 "Illinois River Rag" – 2:39

References

John Hartford albums
1985 albums